Brigitte Bardot (born 28 September 1934) is a French actress, singer and fashion model, who later became an animal rights activist.

Filmography

References
 
 

Bardot, Brigitte
Filmography
Bardot, Brigitte